Thomas Mooney (1882–1942) was an American labor leader in San Francisco.

Thomas, Tom or Tommy Mooney may also refer to:

Tom Mooney (baseball) (fl. 1908–1909), American baseball player
Thomas Mooney (chaplain) (1906–1944), Canadian Catholic chaplain
Tom Mooney (footballer) (1910–1981), Scottish footballer (Airdrie, Newcastle, Morton)
Thomas J. Mooney (Maryland politician), American politician who ran against William Donald Schaefer for Governor of Maryland, 1986
Tom Mooney (rugby league) (born 1952), Australian rugby league footballer
Tom Mooney (educator) (1954–2006), American labor leader and teacher from Ohio
Thomas K. Mooney (1962–2007), American diplomat and Army officer
Tommy Mooney (born 1971), English football player
Thomas Mooney (footballer) (born 1973), Northern Irish footballer

Other uses
California Labor School (formerly known as Tom Mooney Labor School), American educational organization